Stanley Obeysekere was the 9th Solicitor General of Ceylon. He was appointed on 1929, succeeding Maas Thajoon Akbar, and held the office until 1932. He was succeeded by L. M. D. de Silva.

References

O